Oleta, a name coming from Old English meaning "winged one", may refer to:

People
Oleta Kirk Abrams, one of the three founders of Bay Area Women Against Rape, the first rape crisis center in the U.S.
Oleta Adams, American soul, jazz, and gospel singer and pianist
Oleta Crain (1913–2007), African-American military officer and federal civil servant

Places
Oleta River, river situated north of Miami that drains the northern Everglades into Biscayne Bay
Oleta River State Park, largest urban park in the Florida State Park system
Fiddletown, California, formerly Oleta